Ittihad Riadhi Baladiat El Kerma, known as IRB El Kerma or simply IRBEK for short, is an Algerian football club based in El Kerma. The club was founded in 1946 and its colours are green and red. Their home stadium, Stade Mohamed Khassani, has a capacity of 8,000 spectators. The club is currently playing in the Algerian Ligue 2.

On August 5, 2020, IRB El Kerma promoted to the Algerian Ligue 2.

References

External links
Ligue Régionale de football de Alger official site

Football clubs in Algeria
IRB El Kerma
Association football clubs established in 1946
Sports clubs in Algeria